Tony To is a television producer and director and current president of production and development at Lucasfilm. He is best known for producing and also directing for the HBO miniseries Band of Brothers, for which he won an Emmy Award. To later returned to produce and direct for the 2010 companion miniseries The Pacific. He has also directed episodes of House and Harsh Realm. Before his position at Lucasfilm, To served as executive vice president of production for The Walt Disney Studios. On July 21, 2020, he and director Daniel Sackheim founded Bedrock Entertainment with ITV Studios America as partner.

Filmography
 The Pacific (TV) (2010)
 House (TV) (2006)
 Band of Brothers (TV) (2001)
 Harsh Realm (TV) (2000)

References

External links 

American film producers
American television directors
American television producers
Living people
Place of birth missing (living people)
Year of birth missing (living people)
Primetime Emmy Award winners
Disney people
Lucasfilm people
American people of Chinese descent
American people of Singaporean descent